The Philippine House Committee on Rules, or House Rules Committee is a standing committee of the Philippine House of Representatives.

Jurisdiction 
As prescribed by House Rules, the committee's jurisdiction includes the following:
 Creation of committees inclusive of determining their respective jurisdictions
 Order of business
 Referral of bills, resolutions, speeches, committee reports, messages, memorials and petitions
 Rules of the House
 Rules of procedure governing inquires in aid of legislation
 Rules of procedure in impeachment proceedings

Members, 19th Congress

Historical members

18th Congress

Deputy Majority Leader 
 Bernadette Herrera-Dy (BH)

Assistant Majority Leaders 
 Marissa Andaya (Camarines Sur–1st, NPC)
 Kristine Singson-Meehan (Ilocos Sur–2nd, Bileg Party)

Notes

References

External links 
House of Representatives of the Philippines

Rules